Green poison frog is a common name for several frogs and may refer to:

Andinobates viridis, endemic to Colombia
Dendrobates auratus, native to central America and northwestern South America, naturalized in Hawaii

Amphibian common names